Between 1920 and 1936 miners in Czechoslovakia elected representative councils. Several different trade unions, representing various different political tendencies, contested the elections.
 
A law for work councils in the mining industry was passed in June, 1920, being the first such law in Czechoslovakia. Councils were elected with tenures of two years. Elections to local mining councils were held at all mines with 20 employees or more. The condition to stand as a candidate was to be a Czechoslovak citizen aged 24 years or older, who had worked at the mine for minimum six months over the past 3 years. In order to vote in the election one had to be a Czechoslovak citizen aged 18 years or older, and having worked at least three months in the past 2 years. Each council had two advisers representing the management, one technical and one commercial.

Results

Summary of 1928 election results
Per Dubský (1984), the elections held in 1928 yielded the following result across the country;

Results in 3 Bohemian districts 1924-1936
Per Oellermann (2013), having slightly different estimates than Dubský, the work council elections in Northern Bohemia, Falkenov and Trautenau had the following composition;

Northern Bohemia

Falkenov

Tratenau

References

Trade unions in Czechoslovakia
Mining trade unions
1920s in Czechoslovakia
1930s in Czechoslovakia
Social history of Czechoslovakia